"Love Overboard" is a Grammy Award-winning 1987 single by Gladys Knight & the Pips.

Chart performance
"Love Overboard" was the group's last of ten #1 hits on the Hot Black Singles chart.  It crossed over to #13 on the Billboard Hot 100 chart as well.  The single was also successful on the dance charts, peaking at number four. It also peaked at #59 on the Canada RPM Top 100 Singles chart.

Popular culture
Knight performs the song in a dream sequence on the episode "Three Girls Three" of A Different World, with Whitley and Jaleesa singing background for her (instead of the Pips).

References

1987 songs
1987 singles
Gladys Knight & the Pips songs
MCA Records singles
Songs written by Reggie Calloway